Dryophylax is a genus of snakes of the family Colubridae.

Geographic range
All species in the genus Dryophylax are endemic to South America.

Species
The following 15 species are recognized as being valid.
 Dryophylax almae Franco & Ferreira, 2003
 Dryophylax ceibae Bailey & Thomas, 2007
 Dryophylax chaquensis Bergna & Álvarez, 1993
 Dryophylax chimanta Roze, 1958 -Roze's coastal house snake 
 Dryophylax corocoroensis Gorzula & Ayarzagüena, 1996
 Dryophylax dixoni Bailey & Thomas, 2007
 Dryophylax duida Myers & Donnelly, 1996
 Dryophylax gambotensis Pérez-Santos & Moreno, 1989
 Dryophylax hypoconia (Cope, 1860)
 Dryophylax marahuaquensis Gorzula & Ayarzagüena, 1996
 Dryophylax nattereri (Mikan, 1820) - Amazon coastal house snake, northern coastal house snake
 Dryophylax paraguanae Bailey & Thomas, 2007
 Dryophylax phoenix Franco, Trevine, Montingelli, & Zaher, 2017
 Dryophylax ramonriveroi Manzanilla & Sánchez, 2005 - Guianan coastal house snake
 Dryophylax yavi Myers & Donnelly, 1996

Nota bene: A binomial authority in parentheses indicates that the species was originally described in a genus other than Dryophylax.

References

Dryophylax
Snake genera
Taxa named by Johann Georg Wagler